Barry Truax (born 1947) is a Canadian composer who specializes in real-time implementations of granular synthesis, often of sampled sounds, and soundscapes. 

He is credited with developing the first ever implementation of real-time granular synthesis in 1986, with being the first composer to explore the range between synchronic and asynchronic granular synthesis in Riverrun (1986), and being the first to use a sample as the source of a granular composition in  Wings of Nike (1987).

Truax is Professor Emeritus of Simon Fraser University, where he taught both electroacoustic music and acoustic communication. He was one of the original members of the World Soundscape Project.

Selected compositions
 The Blind Man (1979)
 Riverrun (1986, Wergo WER 2017-50)
 Wings of Nike (1987, Cambridge Street Records CSR CD-9401 and Perspectives of New Music CD PNM 28)
 Tongues of Angels (1988, Centrediscs CMC CD-4793)
 Beauty and the Beast (1989, Cambridge Street Records CSR-CD 9601)
 Pacific (1990, Cambridge Street Records CSR CD-9101)
 Pacific Fanfare (1996)
 Wings of Fire for female cellist and two digital soundtracks including the Joy Kirstin poem "Wings of Fire" read by Ellie Epp (1996)
 Androgyne, Mon Amour for amplified male double bass player and two digital soundtracks including text from Tennessee Williams' 1977 book of the same title read by Douglas Huffman (1997)

References

Further reading
Interview with Truax by Toru Iwatake (online version). Accessed 4 February 2010 Print version: Computer Music Journal, 18(3), 1994, pp. 17–24.
Interview Asymmetry Music Magazine. Accessed 4 February 2010.

External links
 "Barry Truax: Electroacoustic Composer & Acoustic Communication Researcher", Simon Fraser University, British Columbia

21st-century classical composers
Living people
1947 births
20th-century classical composers
Canadian classical composers
Canadian electronic musicians
Electroacoustic music composers
Canadian male classical composers
20th-century Canadian composers
20th-century Canadian male musicians
21st-century Canadian male musicians